The men's 3000 metres steeplechase event at the 2010 World Junior Championships in Athletics was held in Moncton, New Brunswick, Canada, at Moncton Stadium on 23 and 25 July.

Medalists

Results

Final
25 July

Heats
23 July

Heat 1

Heat 2

Participation
According to an unofficial count, 30 athletes from 21 countries participated in the event.

References

3000 metres steeplechasechase
Steeplechase at the World Athletics U20 Championships